This is a list of the main career statistics of Croatian professional tennis player Marin Čilić. To date, Čilić has won 20 ATP singles titles including one Grand Slam singles title at the 2014 US Open, one ATP Masters 1000 title at the 2016 Western & Southern Open and a record four titles at the PBZ Zagreb Indoors. Other highlights of Čilić's career thus far include finals at the 2017 Wimbledon Championships and 2018 Australian Open. Čilić achieved a career high singles ranking of World No. 3 on 29 January 2018.

Career achievements 

In August 2008, Čilić reached his first career singles final at the Pilot Pen Tennis event in New Haven, where he defeated Mardy Fish in three sets to win his first ATP singles title. The following year, Čilić claimed the first of his four titles at the PBZ Zagreb Indoors with a straight sets victory over his compatriot Mario Ančić in the final before advancing to his first grand slam quarterfinal at the US Open after a straight sets win over then World No. 2 Andy Murray before losing to the eventual champion, Juan Martín del Potro in four sets after leading by a set and a break. However, Čilić avenged his defeat to Del Potro at the 2010 Australian Open, where he defeated the Argentine en route to his first grand slam semi-final where he lost to the eventual runner-up, Andy Murray despite winning the first set. By reaching this stage of the event, Čilić became the first Croatian to reach the Australian Open semi-finals and also entered the top ten of the ATP rankings for the first time in his career, thus becoming just the fourth player from his country to do so after his coach, Goran Ivanišević and his compatriots, Ivan Ljubičić and Mario Ančić.

Midway through 2012, Čilić claimed his first career singles titles on grass and clay respectively after a default over David Nalbandian in the final of the Queen's Club Championships and a straight sets victory over Marcel Granollers in the final of the ATP Studena Croatia Open before reaching his third grand slam quarterfinal at the US Open, where he lost to the eventual champion, Andy Murray after leading by a set and 5–1.

In July 2014, Čilić reached his first quarterfinal at the Wimbledon Championships, defeating 2010 runner-up Tomáš Berdych en route before losing in five sets to the top seed and eventual champion, Novak Djokovic. In September, Čilić recorded the third hundred singles win of his career by winning his first grand slam singles title at the US Open, defeating five-time champion, Roger Federer en route and fellow first time grand slam finalist, Kei Nishikori in the final. In doing so, he became the first Croatian player to win a major since his coach, Goran Ivanišević and the first player outside of the top ten to win the last grand slam of the year since Pete Sampras in 2002. Čilić also joined Juan Martín del Potro and Stanislas Wawrinka as the only players outside of the Big Four to have won a grand slam since 2005.

In 2016, Čilić won his first Masters 1000 title in Cincinnati, becoming only the second tennis player outside of the Big Four to win both a Major and a Masters title in the last decade, the other player being Stan Wawrinka. He followed this up with his first ATP 500 victory at the Swiss Indoors. At the 2016 Paris Masters, Čilić gained his first victory over world number one Novak Djokovic to reach the semi-finals, which both guaranteed his place in that year's ATP World Tour Finals and allowed Andy Murray - who Čilić beat for the first time in seven years in the Cincinnati final - to overtake Djokovic at the top of the rankings.

Significant finals

Grand Slam finals

Singles: 3 (1 title, 2 runner-up)

Olympic finals

Doubles: 1 (1 silver medal)

ATP Masters 1000 finals

Singles: 1 (1 title)

ATP career finals

Singles: 36 (20 titles, 16 runner-ups)

Doubles: 2 (2 runner-up)

Team competition finals

Davis Cup: 3 (1 title, 2 runner-ups)

Singles performance timeline

Current through the 2023 Maharashtra Open.

<small>* Čilić withdrew before the second round match at the 2013 Wimbledon.</small>

1Held as Hamburg Masters until 2008, Madrid Masters (clay) 2009–present.
2Held as Madrid Masters (hardcourt) from 2002 to 2008, and Shanghai Masters  2009–present.
32020 Summer Olympics is postponed to 2021 due to COVID-19 pandemic.

Record against top-10 players
Čilić's match record against those who have been ranked in the top 10, with those who have been No. 1 in bold

 Fernando Verdasco: 10–5
 John Isner: 9–3
 Janko Tipsarević: 8–2
 Jürgen Melzer: 7–3
 Kevin Anderson: 6–1
 Roberto Bautista Agut: 6–2
 Jo-Wilfried Tsonga: 6–2
 Tomáš Berdych: 6–6
 Kei Nishikori: 6–9
 Marcos Baghdatis: 5–1
 Mikhail Youzhny: 5–5
 Mardy Fish: 4–0
 Pablo Carreño Busta: 4–1
 Grigor Dimitrov: 4–3
 Tommy Robredo: 4–3
 David Goffin: 4–5
 Fabio Fognini: 4–1
 Hubert Hurkacz: 3–0
 Félix Auger-Aliassime: 3–1
 Ernests Gulbis: 3–1
 Arnaud Clément: 3–2
 Nikolay Davydenko: 3–2
 Karen Khachanov: 3–2
  Andy Murray: 3–12
 Juan Carlos Ferrero: 2–0
 Lucas Pouille: 2–0
 Nicolás Almagro: 2–1
 Andy Roddick: 2–1
 Richard Gasquet: 2–2
 Tommy Haas: 2–2
 Juan Mónaco: 2–2
 Milos Raonic: 2–2
 Diego Schwartzman: 2–2
 Denis Shapovalov: 2–3
 David Ferrer: 2–4
 Andrey Rublev: 3–4
 David Nalbandian: 2–4
 Gilles Simon: 2–6
 Rafael Nadal: 2–7
 Juan Martín del Potro: 2–11
 Stanislas Wawrinka: 2–13
 Novak Djokovic: 2–19
 Mario Ančić: 1–0
 Tim Henman: 1–0
 Thomas Johansson: 1–0
 Rainer Schüttler: 1–0
 Fernando González: 1–1
 Lleyton Hewitt: 1–1
 Stefanos Tsitsipas: 1–1
 James Blake: 1–2
 Ivan Ljubičić: 1–2
 Carlos Alcaraz: 1–3
 Radek Štěpánek: 1–3
 Alexander Zverev: 1–6
 Roger Federer: 1–10
 Nicolas Lapentti: 0–1
 Marat Safin: 0–1
 Jannik Sinner: 0–1
 Nicolas Kiefer: 0–2
 Robin Söderling: 0–2
 Casper Ruud: 0–3
 Daniil Medvedev: 1–3
 Dominic Thiem: 1–4
 Jack Sock: 0–3
 Gael Monfils: 0–4

* Statistics correct as of 2 October 2022.

Best Grand Slam results details 

Top-10 wins
He has a  record against players who were, at the time the match was played, ranked in the top 10.

ATP Tour career earnings* Statistics correct .''

References

External links

 
 
 

Cilic, Marin
Tennis in Croatia